Green to Gold may refer to:
Green to Gold (album), a 2021 studio album by The Antlers
Green to Gold (book), a 2006 book by Daniel C. Esty and Andrew S. Winston
"Green to Gold" (song), the Official song for the 2008 Irish Olympic Team
Green to Gold, a United States Army  ROTC program